361 Degrees International Limited (361°) is a sportswear brand based in China.

As of March 2009, the brand had 5,543 authorized retail outlets in China. The company does not own any of these outlets. They are owned and managed by 3,031 authorized dealers.

They have 7950 authorized retail outlets across the world as of 2020.

History
The company was established in 2003. The brand name "361°" was launched in January 2004. It denotes the 360 degrees in a circle plus one extra degree, representing professional functionality plus an added degree of innovation and creativity. Since 2009, the brand's slogan has been "One Love".

361° was the official sporting wear of the Chinese men's and women's Olympic curling teams during the 2010 Vancouver Olympics.

On 22 October 2014, 361° became the provider of the official uniforms for staff and volunteers at the 2016 Summer Olympics and the 2016 Summer Paralympics in Rio de Janeiro.

They are the official sports apparel partner of the 2022 Asian Games.
they have also online sellers in the whole world. for example USA 361usa.com is their website. Also, 361europe.com and 361asia.com are other websites related to this brand.

References

External links
 

 

Companies listed on the Hong Kong Stock Exchange
Sporting goods manufacturers of China
Badminton equipment manufacturers
Chinese brands
Shoe brands
Sportswear brands
Retail companies of China
Shoe companies of China
Chinese companies established in 2003
Clothing companies established in 2003
Retail companies established in 2003
Companies based in Fujian
2003 establishments in China
2009 initial public offerings
Swimwear manufacturers